Ian Storey-Moore (born 17 January 1945) is an English former association football forward. He scored over 100 league goals for Nottingham Forest, and earned one cap for England during his time there. In 1972, he moved to Manchester United, but his league career was brought to an early end by injury in 1974. He went on to play for non-league Burton Albion, as well as North American Soccer League side Chicago Sting. He later served as player-manager for Shepshed Charterhouse, and for Burton Albion in his third spell at the club, before becoming chief scout at Nottingham Forest and Aston Villa.

Nottingham Forest
Storey-Moore was playing junior football in Scunthorpe when he was spotted by a scout for Nottingham Forest, for whom he signed in May 1961. Johnny Carey became Forest manager in 1963, and he assembled a team including Storey-Moore, Joe Baker and Alan Hinton that, for a long spell, went largely unchanged in challenging for the 1966–67 Football League title. They beat title rivals Manchester United 4–1 at the City Ground on 1 October 1966. The 3–0 win against Aston Villa on 15 April had Forest second in the table, a point behind United. Injuries eventually took effect, meaning Forest had to settle for second place; they also lost in the 1966–67 FA Cup semi-final to Dave Mackay's Tottenham Hotspur.

At Forest, Storey-Moore collected his sole England cap in a game against the Netherlands in 1970. Up until his departure in March 1972, he scored 105 goals in his 236 league games for the club.

Manchester United
In March 1972, Storey-Moore was announced by Derby County manager Brian Clough as having signed for the club, with a fee of £225,000 reportedly agreed. However, Storey-Moore instead opted to sign for Manchester United, managed by Frank O'Farrell. In 1974, he suffered an injury that brought his league career to an end. He had scored 12 goals for United.

Burton Albion
Following his injury, Storey-Moore signed for Southern League side Burton Albion, having been convinced to join by manager Ken Gutteridge. He played for Burton for three seasons from 1974 to 1977, including a spell at North American Soccer League side Chicago Sting in 1975, before moving to Shepshed Charterhouse for his first managerial role in 1977. Storey-Moore returned to Burton as player-manager from 1978 to 1981, before retiring from the game.

After playing
Storey-Moore later became a bookmaker in Nottingham and worked as Forest's chief scout. He went on to work as chief scout at Aston Villa, leaving the role when Martin O'Neill resigned as manager.

References

External links

Legends of the Past
NASL stats
 

1945 births
Living people
English footballers
England international footballers
England under-23 international footballers
Sportspeople from Ipswich
Scunthorpe United F.C. players
Nottingham Forest F.C. players
Manchester United F.C. players
Burton Albion F.C. players
Shepshed Dynamo F.C. players
Burton Albion F.C. managers
English Football League players
English Football League representative players
Association football forwards
English football managers
Chicago Sting (NASL) players
North American Soccer League (1968–1984) players
Nottingham Forest F.C. non-playing staff
Aston Villa F.C. non-playing staff
English expatriate sportspeople in the United States
Expatriate soccer players in the United States
English expatriate footballers